"Sometimes I Feel Like Screaming" is a song on Purpendicular, Deep Purple's first studio album featuring guitarist Steve Morse, which was released in February 1996. The song was released as a CD single with the song "Vavoom: Ted the Mechanic".

This song is considered one of the best tracks recorded by Deep Purple after their reunion in 1984, and it is played frequently in the band's live performances.

Steve Morse remembered the creation process of the song: "“Sometimes I Feel Like Screaming” started as me noodling, playing quietly to myself. Roger and Jon heard what I was doing and said, “What was that, again? Let’s see if it’ll work with this.” It became a song that day. Any idea could grow from a sprout into a tree".

"Sometimes I Feel Like Screaming" was one of the first songs that was recorded with Steve Morse on guitar. It includes a boasting melodic style and vocal outbursts by Ian Gillan and closes with a repeated guitar solo by Morse.

It was part of the following live albums of Deep Purple: Live at The Olympia '96 (1997), Total Abandon: Australia '99 (1999), In Concert with The London Symphony Orchestra (2000), The Soundboard Series (2001), Live at the Rotterdam Ahoy (2002), Live at Montreux 1996 (2006).

Single 
All songs written by  Ian Gillan, Roger Glover, Jon Lord, Steve Morse, Ian Paice. 
 "Sometimes I Feel Like Screaming" (Edited version) - 4:35
 "Vavoom: Ted the Mechanic" - 4:16
 "Sometimes I Feel Like Screaming" - 7:29

References 

1996 songs
Deep Purple songs
Songs written by Ian Gillan
Songs written by Steve Morse
Songs written by Roger Glover
Songs written by Jon Lord
Songs written by Ian Paice